The Trinidad and Tobago national rugby sevens team is a minor national sevens side. It has competed at the Commonwealth Sevens.

Current squad
Squad to 2014 Hong Kong Sevens.
Graeme Alkins
Agboola Silverthorn
Tony Lopez
David Gokool
James Phillip
Jesse Richards
Jonathan O'Connor
Joseph Quashie
Keishon Walker
Kelson Figaro
Wayne Kelly
Aasan Lewis

See also
 Trinidad and Tobago national rugby union team 
 Rugby union in Trinidad and Tobago
 Trinidad and Tobago Rugby Football Union
 Trinidad and Tobago women's national rugby union team

References

Rugby union in Trinidad and Tobago
National rugby sevens teams